Tresfjord is former municipality in Møre og Romsdal county, Norway. The municipality existed from 1899 until its dissolution in 1964. The municipality included the Skorgedalen valley and the area surrounding both sides of the southern half of the Tresfjorden. The village of Tresfjord was the administrative centre of the municipality, and it was the location of Tresfjord Church, the main church for the municipality.

History
The municipality of Sylte was established on 1 January 1899 when it was separated from Vestnes Municipality.  The initial population was 1,408.  The name was changed to Tresfjord on 28 April 1922. During the 1960s, there were many municipal mergers across Norway due to the work of the Schei Committee. On 1 January 1964, the municipality ceased to exist when it became a part of Vestnes Municipality once again.  The population at that time was 1,319.

Government
All municipalities in Norway, including Tresfjord, are responsible for primary education (through 10th grade), outpatient health services, senior citizen services, unemployment and other social services, zoning, economic development, and municipal roads.  The municipality is governed by a municipal council of elected representatives, which in turn elects a mayor.

Municipal council
The municipal council  of Tresfjord was made up of representatives that were elected to four year terms.  The party breakdown of the final municipal council was as follows:

See also
 List of former municipalities of Norway

References

Vestnes
Former municipalities of Norway
1899 establishments in Norway
1964 disestablishments in Norway